The United States Courthouse  at 350 W. First Street in the Civic Center district of downtown Los Angeles opened in October 2016. The building, which houses federal courts and federal law-enforcement departments, is sometimes called the First Street Courthouse.

Emphasis was on the building's being sustainable, secure and cost-effective, according to the GSA which oversaw the project to build the new courthouse, and to optimize court operations, address security concerns, and provide space for the U.S. District Court in Los Angeles. It consolidates many functions that previously were spread across multiple buildings. Major tenants are the U.S. District Court serving the Central District of California, U.S. Marshals Service, GSA, federal public defender (trial preparation space), and U.S. Attorney's office (trial preparation space).

The building features public artworks by local artists Catherine Opie (Yosemite Falls), Mary Corse (lobby hanging), and Gary Simmons (six-panel lobby piece).

See also
 Edward R. Roybal Federal Building and United States Courthouse
 List of United States federal courthouses in California
 List of Los Angeles federal buildings

References

External links
"New United States Courthouse", SOM

Courthouses in California
Buildings and structures in Downtown Los Angeles
Civic Center, Los Angeles
Federal courthouses in the United States
Government buildings in Los Angeles
Federal buildings in Los Angeles
Government buildings completed in 2016
2016 establishments in California
2010s architecture in the United States